Alan Harold Colquhoun (27 June 1921 – 13 December 2012) was an English architect, historian, critic and teacher.

Biography
Colquhoun was born in Eton, Buckinghamshire on 27 June 1921 and attended Bradfield School. He went on to study architecture at the Edinburgh College of Art and the Architectural Association in London. In the Second World War Colquhoun was a captain in the Bengal Sappers and Miners, at Roorkee, India, where he first met future friend and architectural colleague Robert Maxwell. Colquhoun started his career as an architect at London County Council (LCC), and then in the practice of Lyons Israel Ellis where he designed the Bridgnorth Girls' School in Bridgnorth Shropshire, now listed Grade II.

Work
In 1961 Colquhoun co-founded the architectural practice Miller and Colquhoun, remaining a partner until 1989. Highlight of their buildings are a noted refurbishment of Whitechapel Art Gallery in London, Forest Gate High School, the Chemistry Building of Royal Holloway College in Surrey, and several houses and housing schemes in London.

Colquhoun taught at the Architectural Association School of Architecture from 1957 to 1964 and at the Polytechnic of Central London (now University of Westminster) in the mid seventies. He was appointed as a professor at Princeton University School of Architecture in 1981, becoming Professor Emeritus in 1991. He also was a visiting professor at Cornell in 1969, and at Harvard University, Cambridge University,  L'Ecole Polytechnique Federale de Lausanne, and Trinity College, Dublin. He died in London on 13 December 2012.

A biography of Colquhoun was published in 2012: Alan Colquhoun : architect, historicus, criticus = architect, historian, critic. by Tom Avermaete; Christoph Grafe; Hans Teerds.

Publications
Essays in Architectural Criticism: Modern Architecture and Historical Change (Oppositions Books, 1985) According to WorldCat, the book is held in 531 libraries  It has been translated into French by Michèle Osborn, and also into Turkish,  Italian, Catalan, Spanish  and Finnish.
Colquhoun, Miller and Partners - Architects by Alan Colquhoun and John Miller (1988)  New York:Rizzoli.
Modernity and the Classical Tradition: Architectural Essays, 1980-87 MIT Press, 1991. According to WorldCat, the book is held in 448 libraries 
Modern Architecture (Oxford History of Art, 2002) According to WorldCat, the book is held in 1021 libraries  It has been translated into French by Alan Colquhoun as L'architecture moderne.  and into Spanish by Jorge Sainz as La arquitectura moderna : una historia desapasionada 

He also published works on the architects Michael Graves and on Rafael Moneo and the sculptor Celia Scott.

References

External links
 Alan Colquhoun papers, 1942-2010 Held by the Department of Drawings & Archives, Avery Architectural & Fine Arts Library, Columbia University

1921 births
2012 deaths
Alumni of the Edinburgh College of Art
Architects from Buckinghamshire
English critics
20th-century English educators
English historians
Princeton University faculty
Alumni of the Architectural Association School of Architecture